Giannis Tzelepis (born 4 January 1984) is a Greek professional footballer who plays as a centre-back for Football League club OF Ierapetra, for which he is captain.

Club career
Born in Greece, Tzelepis made his senior debut with German side Aschaffenburg U19 and had the contract with the club until July 1999 . On 1, July 1999, he joined the Dutch side Emmen appearing in Eerste Divisie and stayed for Dutch side until 2005. He profoundly played for Greek clubs after 2006.

Then Tzelepis was signed by the German side Aschaffenburg, but this time to cap him in  senior squad for 28 times, securing his first goal for the club. He followed a transfer to OF Ierapetra in 2006 to play in Football League. This involved the first ever participation of Tzelepis in Greek Football Leagues . He then signed a contract of one year with Greek club playing in Greece namely Polykastro F.C. and remained for the club until 2008 appearing twice and secured his maiden club goal. In the mid of 2008 Giannpoulos signed a year spell with the Greece side Alexandroupoli. He accumulated humongous 50 caps and netted the ball twice. and in 2009 he was at Fokikos. He penned a deal with Greek club Eordaikos securing 3 appearances for the club and netted the ball maidenly. The gained a decent momentum for having long-enough period that he appeared for the club.

He then moved to Nafpaktiakos Asteras in 2010 and a transfer to side Anagennisi Ierapetra followed whereby he remained until 2013 playing 8 games.

From 2011, he played for Ierapetra-based football club namely Anagennisi Ierapetra and further moved to Vyzas in 2012 where the defender earned 33 caps for the club. In 2013, he moved to Vyzas

Finally, Tzelepis is playing in Greece for OF Ierapetra also acting as a skipper of the side. 

He had featured in Hessenliga, the top tier of Hesse in Germany, Football League and 5 times in Greek Football Cup or Kypello Elladas (Greek).

References

1984 births
Living people
Greek footballers
Association football defenders
Hessenliga players
Football League (Greece) players
Viktoria Aschaffenburg players
O.F. Ierapetra F.C. players
Polykastro F.C. players
Eordaikos 2007 F.C. players
Enosi Alexandroupoli players
Fokikos A.C. players
Nafpaktiakos Asteras F.C. players
Anagennisi Ierapetra F.C. players
Vyzas F.C. players
Greek expatriate footballers
Greek expatriate sportspeople in the Netherlands
Greek expatriate sportspeople in Germany
Expatriate footballers in the Netherlands
Expatriate sportspeople in Germany
Greek expatriates in the Netherlands
Eerste Divisie players